Neuchâtel Xamax Football Club Serrières or Neuchâtel Xamax FCS is a Swiss football club based in Neuchâtel. It was created in 1970 through a merger between FC Cantonal, founded in 1906 and Swiss champions of 1916, and FC Xamax founded in 1912. The name Xamax comes from legendary Swiss international player 'Xam' Max Abegglen, one of the founding members. Xamax Neuchâtel FCS obtained its current name after a merger with FC Serrières, another side from Neuchâtel, in May 2013.

History
Students at the Collège latin in Neuchâtel began playing organized football in 1910 soon after, in 1912, Neuchâtel Xamax was officially founded.

They have been champions of Switzerland on two occasions, in successive years in 1987 and 1988. The club has also made it to 5 Swiss Cup finals, the most recent in 2011, but have failed to win any of them.

After many financial crises, the club declared bankruptcy on 26 January 2012 and was consequently excluded from Swiss Super League. The club was reformed, but had to restart in the Swiss amateur leagues, entering the 2. Liga Interregional, the fifth tier of the Swiss football league system, for the 2012–13 season. The club finished first in 2013 and was promoted to the 1. Liga Classic for 2013–14. Once again, Xamax finished first, winning the play-off to secure a second successive promotion. Xamax won 1. Liga Promotion, the third tier of Swiss league system and promoted to Challenge League after making third successive promotion in 2014–15 season.

The club finally won promotion back to the Swiss Super League in 2018 after bankruptcy and six years in the lower leagues.

Stadium
The club plays its home matches at the Stade de la Maladière, which began construction in 2004 and was opened in 2007. It has a capacity of 12,500 spectators.

Current squad

Notable players

Africa
Cameroon
 Freddy Mveng
Central African Republic
 Louis Mafouta
Egypt
 Hossam Hassan
Ivory Coast
 Eric Tia
Nigeria
 Brown Ideye
 Kalu Uche 
Senegal
 Papa Bouba Diop
Sierra Leone
 Umaru Bangura 
Asia
Philippines
 Michael Kempter
Saudi Arabia
 Hussein Abdulghani 
Europe
Bosnia and Herzegovina
 Mustafa Sejmenović 
 Ensar Arifović 
Bulgaria
 Trifon Ivanov
Hungary
 Lajos Détári
Germany (West Germany)
 Uli Stielike
Ireland
 Don Givens 
Liechtenstein
 Noah Frick
Spain
 Víctor Sánchez 
Switzerland
 Johan Djourou
 Lucien Favre
 Mario Gavranović
 Haris Seferovic

Honours
Leagues
 Swiss Super League
 Winner (2): 1986–87, 1987–88
 Swiss Challenge League
 Winner (3): 1972–73, 2006–07, 2017–18
 Swiss Promotion League
 Winner: 2014–15
 1. Liga Classic
 Winner: 2013–14
 2. Liga Interregional
 Winner: 2012–13
Cups
 Swiss Super Cup
 Winner (3): 1987, 1988, 1990

Former coaches

European record

References

External links
Neuchâtel Xamax unofficial website 
Soccerway profile

 
Football clubs in Switzerland
Association football clubs established in 1912
Neuchâtel
1912 establishments in Switzerland
Sport in Neuchâtel